Markus Fuchs (born 24 February 1980 in Rottweil) is a German football player. He made his debut on the professional league level in the 2. Bundesliga for 1. FC Nürnberg on 16 November 2008, when he came on as a substitute for Isaac Boakye in the 90th minute of a game against FC Ingolstadt 04.

Honours
 Regionalliga West (IV): 2010

References

External links
 

1980 births
Living people
German footballers
1. FC Nürnberg players
1. FC Nürnberg II players
1. FC Saarbrücken players
SV Eintracht Trier 05 players
2. Bundesliga players
3. Liga players
SC Pfullendorf players
Association football forwards
People from Rottweil
Sportspeople from Freiburg (region)
Footballers from Baden-Württemberg
21st-century German people